Aughton is a village near Rotherham in South Yorkshire, England, located in the civil parish of Aston cum Aughton,  south of Rotherham. The village setting is rural, being surrounded by fields. The nearest settlements are Guilthwaite in the north, Ulley in the east, Aston in the southeast, Swallownest in the south, and Treeton in the northwest. Major roads are A618 running north–south and B6067 running northwest–southeast which cross in the northern part of the village and share a common alignment along the northern  of Main Street.

Aughton was mentioned in 1066 in the Domesday Book as belonging to three Anglo-Saxon lords. By 1086, it had passed to Richard of Sourdeval, whose tenant-in-chief was Count Robert of Mortain.

See also
Listed buildings in Aston cum Aughton

References

External links

Villages in South Yorkshire